Osgoode Hall Law School, commonly shortened to Osgoode, is the law school of York University in Toronto, Ontario, Canada.

The law school is home to the Law Commission of Ontario, the Journal of Law and Social Policy, and the Osgoode Hall Law Journal. A variety of LL.M. and Ph.D. degrees in law are available.

Its alumni include two Canadian prime ministers, eight premiers of Ontario, and ten Justices of the Supreme Court of Canada, four of whom were Chief Justices. The current dean of the law school is Mary Condon.

History 
Osgoode Hall was named for William Osgoode, an Oxford University graduate and barrister of Lincoln's Inn who was the first to serve as the chief justice of Upper Canada.

Osgoode Hall can trace its history back to the 1820s, and count the first Canadian prime minister Sir John A. Macdonald among its graduates. In 1889, it was reorganized and the Law Society of Upper Canada permanently established the Law School on the site now known as Osgoode Hall. At the time, Osgoode Hall was the only law school in Ontario and this remained true until the establishment of the University of Toronto Faculty of Law in 1949.

Ontario lawyers were originally required to attend Osgoode Hall in order to practise in the province. The Law Society began requiring members to attend lectures given at Osgoode Hall (the building) in 1855. In 1862, a law school opened in that building, only to close in 1868. It frequently opened and closed throughout the late 19th century. The law school at Osgoode Hall was only titled "Osgoode Hall Law School" in March 1924, when the Law Society of Upper Canada formally assigned it that name.

The school signed an agreement of affiliation with York University in 1965 following a decision by the provincial government requiring all law schools to be affiliated with a university. The minister (Ministry of University Affairs) responsible for the decision, Bill Davis, was an Osgoode graduate in 1954.

It was originally located at Osgoode Hall in downtown Toronto, which also houses the headquarters of the Law Society, and relocated to York University's Keele Campus in 1969.

Rankings and reputation

Osgoode Hall is one of the most elite law schools in Canada. Times Higher Education ranked Osgoode Hall Law School as a top-50 law school in the world in 2022. Its long and distinguished history has led to a lay prestige that is unmatched by any other Canadian law school. In 2022, Osgoode's joint JD/MBA program with the Schulich School of Business was named among the top 10 business and law programs in North America by FIND MBA.

In its most recent rankings, Maclean's magazine has ranked Osgoode second amongst Canadian law schools. In the 2008 rankings published by Canadian Lawyer Magazine, Osgoode was ranked first in Canada, and was awarded high marks for the quality of its professors, flexible curriculum, and the diversity and relevance of course offerings. The faculty has been described as the "strongest in the country," and rank number one in Canada for faculty journal citations. 

In the 2022-2023 year, 3600 applicants applied for the 290 spots available in the first year program, resulting in an acceptance rate of around 8%. The only North American law school with a lower rate of acceptance is Yale Law School.

Original building and current facilities

For its first eight decades, Osgoode Hall Law School was located at Osgoode Hall at the corner of Queen Street and University Avenue. The structures at Queen and University (the earliest dating from 1832) are still known as Osgoode Hall. They remain the headquarters of the Law Society of Upper Canada and house the Court of Appeal for Ontario.

Currently, the law school is located on the Keele Campus of York University, in the Toronto suburb of North York. In May 2007, Dean Monahan announced plans for an extensive renovation and extension of Osgoode Hall Law School  involving a renovation of the existing building, and the addition of an additional wing. The building was designed by architect Jack Diamond with the construction of the renovated building beginning in the summer of 2009.  The project had been majorly funded by a  $2.5 million gift by Ignat Kaneff, and the building has been renamed in his honor. The law school is referred to by York as its faculty of law. Osgoode's Professional Development offices and classrooms are based at 1 Dundas Street West in Downtown Toronto, overlooking Yonge-Dundas Square.

Student life
The Legal & Literary Society, Osgoode Hall Law School's official student society, coordinates student activities both on and off campus. The organization also funds over fifty student clubs, as well as the student newspaper, Obiter Dicta.

Osgoode hosts Professional Development Programs (OPD) which are located in downtown Toronto at 1 Dundas Street near the original Osgoode Hall building.

Notable alumni

Supreme Court of Canada justices
John Robert Cartwright, former Chief Justice
Peter Cory, former Puisne Judge and former Chancellor of York University
Sir Lyman Duff, former Chief Justice
Frank Joseph Hughes, former Puisne Judge
Wilfred Judson, former Puisne Judge
Andromache Karakatsanis, current Puisne Judge
Patrick Kerwin, former Chief Justice
Bora Laskin, former Chief Justice
Malcolm Rowe, current Puisne Judge
Wishart Spence, former Puisne Judge
Michelle O'Bonsawin, current Puisne Judge

Other judges
John Arnup, Moderator for United Church of Canada, Justice at Ontario Court of Appeal
George Ethelbert Carter
Kim Carter, Chief Military Judge of the Canadian Forces
(Jack Sydney George) Bud Cullen, Judge at Federal Court of Canada
Charles Dubin, former Chief Justice of Ontario
Daniel Dumais (LL.M.), Emeritus Lawyer distinction from Barreau du Quebec, Puisne Judge of Superior Court of Quebec
Asher Grunis, President of the Supreme Court of Israel
Sydney Harris (judge), activist lawyer and judge, President of the Canadian Jewish Congress
Bill Hastings, Chief Justice of Kiribati, Chief Censor of New Zealand, District Court Judge of New Zealand
Russell G. Juriansz, first South Asian appointed to Ontario Court of Appeal
Harry S. Laforme, Justice at Ontario Court of Appeal
Patrick LeSage, Chief Justice of Ontario Superior Court of Justice
Malcolm Archibald Macdonald, Chief Justice of British Columbia
Mark MacGuigan, Attorney General of Canada, Justice of the Federal Court of Appeal
Goldwyn Arthur Martin, QC, Justice at Ontario Court of Appeal
Roy McMurtry, Chief Justice of Ontario,  Attorney General of Ontario, Canadian High Commissioner to the United Kingdom
James Chalmers McRuer, Ontario Court of Appeal, Chief Justice at High Court of Justice of Ontario
Charles Terrence Murphy, Judge at Ontario Superior Court, President of North Atlantic Assembly
Willy Mutunga, former Chief Justice of Kenya
Dennis O'Connor, Associate Chief Justice of Ontario
George Bligh O'Connor, Chief Justice of Alberta from 1950 to 1956
James O'Reilly, Federal Court Judge
Coulter Osborne, arbitrator, Associate Chief Justice of Ontario
John Richard, NAFTA Adjudicator, Chief Justice of the Federal Court of Appeal
Lorne Sossin, Justice at the Ontario Court of Appeal
Charles Allan Stuart, Justice of the Supreme Court of Alberta
Michael Tulloch, Justice at the Ontario Court of Appeal
Karen M. Weiler, past Judge Court Martial Appeal Court of Canada, Justice at Ontario Court of Appeal
Sharon A. Williams, Judge ad litem at the International Criminal Tribunal for the Former Yugoslavia
Warren Winkler, Chief Justice of Ontario

Prime Ministers
Sir John A MacDonald
William Lyon Mackenzie King

Premiers
Bill Davis, 18th Premier of Ontario
George Drew, 14th Premier of Ontario
Ernie Eves, 23rd Premier of Ontario
Howard Ferguson, 9th Premier of Ontario
Leslie Frost, 16th Premier of Ontario
William Howard Hearst, 7th Premier of Ontario
Rachel Notley, 17th Premier of Alberta
John Robarts, 17th Premier of Ontario

Government
Todd McCarthy (politician), Member of Provincial Parliament for Durham, Parliamentary Assistant to the President of the Treasury Board, Deputy Government Whip
John Black Aird, former Lieutenant Governor of Ontario, Canadian Senator and founding partner of Aird & Berlis LLP
Lincoln Alexander, 24th Lieutenant Governor of Ontario
Daniel J. Arbess, member of Council on Foreign Relations
Oliver Mowat Biggar, co-founder of Smart & Biggar, first Chief Electoral Officer of Canada
Leonard Braithwaite, member of  Ontario Parliament
Lionel Chevrier, Attorney General of Canada, President of Privy Council of Canada, High Commissioner to the UK
Ward Elcock, Director of Canadian Security Intelligence Service
Gordon Fairweather, Attorney General of New Brunswick, first Chief Commissioner of the Canadian Human Rights Commission
Jim Flaherty, Minister of Finance of Canada
Hugh Guthrie, Attorney General of Canada, Minister of National Defence
Ross Hornby, former Ambassador of Canada to the European Union
Ron Irwin, former Ambassador to Ireland
James Kelleher, Solicitor General of Canada, Member of the Canadian Senate
Judy LaMarsh, Secretary of State for Canada, broadcaster
Allan Leal, President of the Empire Club of Canada, Rhodes Scholar
Sir James Alexander Lougheed, Calgary businessman and Government Leader in the Canadian Senate
Alexander Malcolm Manson, Attorney General of British Columbia, Judge
John Matheson, M.P., Justice of Ontario, helped develop Canada's flag and the Order of Canada
John Pallett, Chief Gov't Whip, leader of Canadian delegation to NATO
Lawrence Pennell, Solicitor General of Canada
Lionel Perez (politician), Montreal city councilor and member of Union Montreal
Richard Rohmer, aviator, Air Force General, lawyer, author, Honorary Advisor to Chief of Defense Staff
Dianne Saxe, environmental lawyer and scholar, Environmental Commissioner of Ontario
Ian Scott, constitutional lawyer, Attorney General of Ontario
Jagmeet Singh, Canadian politician, Leader of the New Democratic Party of Canada
Sinclair Stevens, banker, President of the Treasury Board
 John Tory, 65th Mayor of Toronto, Former President and CEO of Rogers Media Inc., Former Chairman of the CFL
George Stanley White, former Speaker of the Canadian Senate
James Worrall,  Chair of IOC Commission on The Olympic Charter, President of the Canadian Olympic Committee

Law
Austin Cooper (lawyer), criminal lawyer, defended Keith Richards in Toronto
Marlys Edwardh, civil rights
Fraser Elliott, founder of Stikeman Elliott, President of the Art Gallery of Ontario
Edwin A. Goodman, founding partner of Goodmans
Randal Graham, law professor, novelist 
Edward Greenspan, criminal lawyer
Gordon Henderson, President, Canadian bar association, Chancellor, University of Ottawa
Marie Henein, criminal lawyer, defended Jian Ghomeshi
Jeffry House, refugee law, war resisters
Gord Kirke, sports and entertainment lawyer
M. David Lepofsky, disability and human rights lawyer 
John Rosen, criminal lawyer
Stuart Alexander Henderson, successfully defended Gunanoot

Business
Sir Edward Wentworth Beatty, president of the Canadian Pacific Railway
Marshall A. Cohen, Director at Barrick Gold Corporation & Toronto-Dominion Bank, member Trilateral Commission
Dame Moya Greene, Former CEO of Canada Post, Former CEO of Royal Mail
Sergio Marchionne, CEO of Fiat Chrysler Automobiles
Charles Peter McColough, CEO and Chairman of Xerox Corporation, member of Council on Foreign Relations
Jagoda Pike, former publisher of the Toronto Star
Arthur Richard Andrew Scace, Chairman of Bank of Nova Scotia, director of Canadian Opera Company
Kathleen Taylor, Chair of Royal Bank of Canada
John S. D. Tory, founder of Torys and Director of A.V. Roe Canada

Arts
Morley Callaghan, novelist
Murray Cohl, co-founder of the Toronto International Film Festival
Daniel Iron, film and TV producer
Jerry Levitan, Oscar nominee
Tom MacInnes, poet
Aaron Schwartz (Canadian actor)

Science/medicine
Robert Elgie, Ontario Minister of Labour, became a neurosurgeon after becoming a lawyer

Scholarship
Payam Akhavan, international human rights
Constance Backhouse, legal scholar and historian, President of the American Society of Legal History
Deborah Coyne, constitutional law and international relations
Giuseppina d'Agostino, intellectual property 
Michael Geist, internet and privacy law
Colleen Hanycz, principal of Brescia University College from 2008-2015, current university president of La Salle University
James C. Hathaway, international refugee law
Michael Mandel, law professor, international criminal law
Lyal S. Sunga, international humanitarian law, international human rights law, international criminal law.
Paul C. Weiler, Emeritus Professor of Law, Harvard Law School

Sportspersons
George Dudley, inductee of the Hockey Hall of Fame and executive for the Canadian Amateur Hockey Association

Notable professors
Jean-Gabriel Castel, private international law, decorated member of French Resistance
Peter Hogg, Canadian constitutional law, authored most-cited book at Supreme Court of Canada
Gord Kirke, sports and entertainment lawyer
 Deborah McGregor, Whitefish Bay Ojibway environmentalist, educator
Obiora Chinedu Okafor, international and human rights law, also UN Independent Expert on Human Rights and International Solidarity
David Vaver, intellectual property law, also Emeritus Professor at Oxford University
John Borrows, Indigenous legal scholar

See also
List of law schools in Canada

References

Footnotes
Footnote. Lorne Sossin Accessed October 13, 2012.
Footnote. Dean of Osgoode  2010 Accessed October 2012.

External links
 
 

 
1889 establishments in Ontario
Educational institutions established in 1889
Law schools in Canada
York University